David, Dave, or Davey Hamilton may refer to:

Film and media
 David Hamilton (broadcaster) (born 1938), British broadcaster
 David Hamilton (Canadian producer), Canadian film producer
 David Hamilton (photographer) (1933–2016), British photographer and film director
 David Hamilton (born 1939), writer and former editor of The Iowa Review

Government
 David Hamilton (British politician) (born 1950), Scottish MP
 David Hamilton (Canadian politician), county administrator for Hernando County, Florida, US and mayor of Thunder Bay, Ontario, Canada
 David Hamilton (judge) (born 1957), American judge

Music
 David Hamilton (composer) (born 1955), New Zealand contemporary composer
 David Hamilton (tenor) (born 1960), Scottish-born Australian operatic tenor
 Dave Hamilton (musician) (1920–1994), American musician with The Funk Brothers, and record producer

Sports
 Dave Hamilton (baseball) (born 1947), American baseball pitcher
 Davey Hamilton (born 1962), American race car driver
 Davey Hamilton Jr. (born 1997), American race car driver, son of the above
 David Hamilton (baseball), (born 1997), American baseball infielder
 David Hamilton (footballer) (born 1960), English footballer
 Davie Hamilton (1882–1950), Scottish footballer

Other
 David Hamilton of Cadzow (c. 1333 – c. 1392), 3rd Laird of Cadzow, Scottish nobleman
 David Hamilton (architect) (1768–1843), Scottish architect
 David Hamilton (bishop) (died 1523), Bishop of Argyll and Abbot of Dryburgh
 David Hamilton (businessman) (1923–2007), British businessman
 David Hamilton (diarist) (1663–1721), Scottish diarist and doctor to Queen Anne
 David Henry Hamilton (1843–1929), Texas farmer, businessman, and statesman
 David James Hamilton (1849–1909), Scottish pathologist
 David Osborne Hamilton (1893–1953), American poet

See also
 David Hamilton Golland (born 1971), American historian
 Andrew D. Hamilton (born 1952), British-American chemist and academic
 Gustav David Hamilton (1699–1788), Swedish count and soldier
 D. Hamilton Jackson (1884–1946), labor rights advocate in the Danish West Indies and United States Virgin Islands